is a former Japanese football player.

Playing career
Gokyu was born in Tsu on June 11, 1983. After graduating from high school, he joined J2 League club Cerezo Osaka in 2002. Although he could not play at all in the match, Cerezo was promoted to J1 League end of 2002 season. Although he debuted in September 2003 and played several matches as forward, he could not play many matches until 2004. In 2005, he moved to newly was promoted to J2 club, Thespa Kusatsu. Although he played many matches, he could only score 1 goal. In 2006, he moved to Japan Football League (JFL) club Sagawa Express Osaka (later Sagawa Express, Sagawa Shiga). He became a regular forward and scored many goals. He also became a top scorer with 30 goals in 2007 season. In 2008, he moved to J2 club Yokohama FC. However he could not play many matches. In August 2009, he moved to JFL club FC Machida Zelvia and played many matches. In 2010, he re-joined Sagawa Shiga for the first time in 3 years. He played as regular forward and became a top scorer with 27 goals in 2010 season. However his opportunity to play decreased from 2011 and the club was disbanded end of 2012 season. In 2013, he moved to JFL club SC Sagamihara and played many matches as regular forward. In 2014, he moved to Regional Leagues club FC Osaka. The club was promoted to JFL from 2015. He retired end of 2015 season.

Club statistics

References

External links

1983 births
Living people
Association football people from Mie Prefecture
Japanese footballers
J1 League players
J2 League players
Japan Football League players
Cerezo Osaka players
Thespakusatsu Gunma players
Sagawa Shiga FC players
Yokohama FC players
FC Machida Zelvia players
SC Sagamihara players
FC Osaka players
Association football forwards